Town House Brook is a watercourse in Greater Manchester and a tributary of the River Roch.

Tributaries

Long Clough Brook
Turn Slack Brook
Blue Pot Brook
Stony Brook

Rivers of the Metropolitan Borough of Rochdale
Littleborough, Greater Manchester
1